The Transatlantics were a funk and soul band from Adelaide, South Australia, formed in 2007.

Biography 
The band was formed in 2007 by Adelaide-born musicians Ross McHenry, Lachlan Ridge, Kevin Van Der Zwaag and singer Tara Lynch, after they met at university. The band came to prominence through gigs with artists such as Eddie Bo, Roy Ayers and Ohmega Watts.

In 2008, some of the band members formed a new band, intended as a side-project to explore a freer style of music, calling themselves the Shaolin Afronauts. Both bands continued to make music in the following years.

After garnering a following within Adelaide throughout 2008, the Transatlantics embarked on a national tour in 2009 with soul diva Marva Whitney. The tour was cancelled when Whitney collapsed on stage at a performance at The Falls Festival in Lorne, Victoria. Despite this setback, the band continued to tour and were signed to Freestyle Records to release their self-titled, debut album in October 2010.

By this time, the band had grown to eight members. Most of the songs were their own, but the album included a cover of the Presets' "Talk Like That". Reviewers compared the band to the Melbourne deep funk band The Bamboos and American diva Sharon Jones.

The four original members still formed the core of the band as of 2011, with their ranks swollen to number ten musicians by 2012, when they recorded their second album. The Transatlantics second album, Find My Way Home, was released in October 2012. The vocals of the now three female vocalists (Tara Lynch having been joined by Naomi Keyte and Laura Knowling) were praised by one reviewer.

The band stopped working together from July 2013, until they returned to performing in January 2017. According to their Facebook page, they performed at the Melbourne Bowling Club in  May 2018 and at the Grace Emily in Adelaide in December 2018.

Discography

Albums

Awards and nominations

National Live Music Awards 
The National Live Music Awards (NLMAs) are a broad recognition of Australia's diverse live industry, celebrating the success of the Australian live scene. The awards commenced in 2016.

|-
| National Live Music Awards of 2016
| Naomi Keyte  
| South Australian Live Voiceof the Year
| 
|-

Individuals

Naomi Keyte
Before joining the Transatlantics, Keyte was in the indie band Gold Bloom, which performed at Laneway and Fuse Festivals and released an EP, Sidelines, on 22 September 2012.

Naomi Keyte released a solo album, Melaleuca, in 2017, a " a 10-track homage to Adelaide’s natural landscape", and was subsequently nominated for three South Australian Music Awards: Best Release, Best Folk, and Best Female Artist. She played at festivals Here's to Now in 2017, the Basket Range Festival and WOMADelaide in 2018 and OzAsia in 2019. She released a single called "Travelling Woman" in May 2020.

Tara Lynch
Original vocalist Tara Lynch married bass player Ross McHenry (leader of Shaolin Afronauts and a jazz trio since 2016), changing her surname to McHenry, and they have at least one child together, born around 2014. As of 2016 she was working for History SA.

Ross McHenry

Members 
As of 2010, the band members were listed as:

 Randall (Lachlan?) "Country" Ridge jnr – Guitar
 Kyra Schwarz – Trombone
 Kevin van der Zwaag – Drums & Good Vibes
 Chris Weber – Trumpet
 Tara Lynch – Vocals
 Jon "Sugarcane" Hunt – Baritone Saxophone
 Ross McHenry – Bass
 Kahil Nayton – Guitar

As of March 2012, the line-up was:
 Tara Lynch – Vocals
 Naomi Keyte – Vocals
 Laura Knowling – Vocals
 Randall "Country" Ridge jnr – Guitar
 Kyra Schwarz – Trombone
 Kevin van der Zwaag – Drums
 Chris Weber – Trumpet
 Jon "Sugarcane" Hunt – Baritone Saxophone
 Ross McHenry – Bass
 Dylan Marshall – Guitar

References 

Australian soul musicians
Musical groups established in 2007
Musical groups disestablished in 2018
Australian funk musical groups
Australian contemporary R&B musical groups
Musical groups from Adelaide